American singer India Arie has released six studio albums, one extended plays, and eighteen singles.

Studio albums

Extended plays
 SongVersation: Medicine (June 30, 2017)

Singles

Notes

As a featured guest

References

Discographies of American artists
Rhythm and blues discographies
Soul music discographies